Masrik may refer to:
Mets Masrik, a town in the Gegharkunik province of Armenia
Pokr Masrik, a town in the Gegharkunik Province of Armenia